Hočko Pohorje is a settlement in the Municipality of Hoče-Slivnica in northeastern Slovenia. It lies in the eastern Pohorje Hills south of Maribor. The area is part of the traditional region of Styria. The municipality is now included in the Drava Statistical Region.

Mass grave
Hočko Pohorje is the site of a mass grave from the period immediately after the Second World War. The second is right of the cross and measures . They contain the remains of civilians and/or prisoners of war transported to the Pohorje Hills from Maribor and its surroundings and murdered in May and June 1945.

Radar tower

The Slovene military radar station RP-2 (RP stands for radarska postaja 'radar station') is located at Ledinekov Kogel, a hill in the territory of Hočko Pohorje. The radar station at Ledinekov Kogel was built in 2005 and initially operated a radar of the model AN/TPS-70, whereas the GM 403 radar was set up in 2011.

References

External links
 
Hočko Pohorje on Geopedia.si
Hočko Pohorje on Google Maps (map, photographs, street view)

Populated places in the Municipality of Hoče-Slivnica